Sir Barrie Heath,  (11 September 1916 – 22 February 1988) was a Royal Air Force Spitfire pilot who fought in the Battle of Britain, and was awarded the Distinguished Flying Cross. Heath shot down four enemy aircraft (including two "probables") and damaged two others. After the Second World War he had a successful career in industry, rising to become chairman of the industrial conglomerate GKN. In 1978 he received a knighthood for services to export.

Early life

Heath was born in Kings Norton, Warwickshire, on 11 September 1916. His older brother Grahame was a pilot in the Royal Flying Corps and was killed in action in the First World War.

Second World War

Heath saw active service in 1940 with No. 611 Squadron RAF, flying in Spitfire IIa P7883 "Grahame Heath", which had been donated by his father G.F. Heath in memory of his son Grahame.

Such donations were not uncommon at the time; many patriotic individuals as well as towns and other organisations were encouraged to donate the cost of an airframe. The cost of a Spitfire was set by the government at £5,000, a very large sum at the time, although the real cost of manufacturing the aircraft was more than £10,000. By way of honouring the donation, the aircraft was permitted to bear the name of the donor himself, or any other name they chose. Approximately 1500 "presentation" Spitfires were donated during the course of the war, representing about 17% of total production.

Criticised by squadron commanding officer, Squadron Leader James Ellis McComb, for damaging his Spitfire on landing, Heath is said to have replied: "this is my Spit and I'll fly it any bloody way I like".

According to the official No. 611 Squadron RAF website, between June 1940 and February 1941, Heath shot down 4 enemy aircraft (including two "probables") and damaged two others. 

He was made 'B' Flight Commander in November 1940.
Early in 1941 he was posted to No. 64 Squadron, becoming CO in March 1941. He was rested in September 1941, transferring to Fighter Command HQ, and in late 1942 was Wing Commander, Tactics. In 1944, he became Wing Leader, 244 Wing in Italy, later commanding 324 Wing.

In 1944, as the tide of war turned in favour of the Allies, Heath (by now Wing Commander Heath) served with No. 43 Squadron RAF in France, known by its squadron insignia as the "fighting cocks", or "les coqs Anglais" as the local French population dubbed it. By now the squadron's main role was ground attack, strafing and occasionally dive bombing enemy targets.

On 9 September 1944, Heath, now commander of No. 324 Wing RAF and flying Spitfire IX MJ628, led a formation on the squadron's first sortie into German territory, strafing motor transport and railway communications.

Postwar career

After the war, Heath pursued a successful career in manufacturing industry. In 1946 he left the RAF and was appointed to the board of Hobourn aero components, Coventry. In 1960 he joined Triplex Safety Glass Ltd as their managing director and, in 1967, joined the board of the parent company Pilkington Brothers. In 1975 he took over from Sir Raymond Brookes to become chairman of the industrial conglomerate GKN, and in 1978 he received a knighthood. Among the problems Heath had to contend with as chairman were hyperinflation, the oil crisis, and declining demand for steel and automotive parts.

In an article in Time magazine in May 1979 he was described as "one of Britain's most respected business leaders", and as having "advised the new Conservative government 'not to rush in and try to bring in laws to restrict the unions. Such a course of action would be the death knell for British industry'."

Tony Jeeves, a former colleague at GKN, described him as "a great boss, incredibly kind and generous but certainly did not suffer fools gladly ... people either loved or hated him". He retired from GKN in 1980.

Barrie Heath and his wife, Joan, lived at Penn, Buckinghamshire, where, after his death, Lady Heath moved to a smaller property, swapping homes with her friend and neighbour, cookery writer Dame Mary Berry. 

Their son, Duncan, is a talent agent. Son Ian Heath (died 1996) was married to actress Vicki Hodge (daughter of Sir John Rowland Hodge, 2nd Baronet) from 1969 to 1980.

Honours and awards
29 April 1941 – Acting Squadron Leader Barrie Heath (90818), Auxiliary Air Force, No. 611 Squadron is awarded the Distinguished Flying Cross for gallantry and devotion to duty in the execution of air operations.
3 June 1978 – Barrie Heath, DFC, AE, group chairman of Guest Keen and Nettlefolds Limited is awarded the Honour of Knighthood for services to export which was presented on 12 July 1978.

References

Bibliography
Saunders, Andy. (2003). No 43 Squadron (Aviation Elite Units) Osprey Publishing.

External links
History of no43 Squadron, the "Fighting Cocks". Retrieved: 16 February 2010.
Spitfire society webpage. Retrieved: 16 February 2010.
article at www.fightglobal.com. Retrieved: 16 February 2010.
Official 611 Squadron website. Retrieved: 16 February 2010.
Stories of Barrie Heath at Official 611 Squadron website. Retrieved: 16 February 2010.

1916 births
1988 deaths
Knights Bachelor
Recipients of the Distinguished Flying Cross (United Kingdom)
Royal Air Force pilots of World War II
Royal Air Force officers
English aviators
The Few